Dai 7 Jikkenshitsu is the first major label album of the band Cali Gari. The album has an expressive style that incorporates many different musical components and is not typical visual kei.

Track listing
Dai 7 Jikkenshitsu Intro (「第7実験室」入口) – 0:17
Haikara•Satsubatsu•Haiso•Zessan (ハイカラ・殺伐・ハイソ・絶賛) – 4:31
Mahoraba Blues (まほらば憂愁 （ブルーズ）) – 3:38
Maguro (マグロ) – 4:44
Drama: Kuroi Kyuutai (ドラマ「黒い球体」) – 5:15
Kuroi Kyuutai (黒い球体) – 3:51
Kill, Kill, Maim! (きりきりまいむ) – 2:35
Digitable Niuniu (デジタブルニウニウ) – 5:07
Tainai Souon Ayanashi Anti-Kushou (体内騒音あやなしアンチ苦笑)– 2:28
Wazurai (わずらい) – 3:57
Tokyo Rose au Monde Club (東京（トキオ）ロゼヲモンド倶楽部) – 5:16
Sora mo Waratteru (空も笑ってる) – 6:28
Tokyo-Byou (東京病) – 8:13
Dai 7 Jikkenshitsu Outro (「第7実験室」出口) – 0:04

Personnel
Shuuji Ishii – vocals
Ao Sakurai – guitar
Kenjirou Murai – bass
Makoto Takei – drums

References

Cali Gari albums
2002 albums